Lažiše is a settlement in the Municipality of Dobje in eastern Slovenia. The area is part of the traditional region of Styria. It is now included with the rest of the municipality in the Savinja Statistical Region.

References

External links
Lažiše on Geopedia

Populated places in the Municipality of Dobje